is the founder and former CEO of TV Tokyo Broadband. TV Tokyo Broadband, also known as TXBB, went public on the Tokyo Stock Exchange in 2005. The company also was the largest shareholder of InterFM (officially: FM Inter-Wave) in Tokyo, Japan.

Career
As CEO of TXBB, he was responsible for bringing many famous animations such as Peanuts, Snoopy and Woodstock, Teenage Mutant Ninja Turtles, France's Miffy, and Russia's Cheburashka, among others, to Japan. He also revived the fortunes of the children's program Sesame Street when he created a consortium to control the show's fortunes in Japan after NHK dropped it. The consortium soon turned it around and made Sesame Street into a successful program in Japan.

References

External links
  Acrodea, TV Tokyo Broadband in basic accord for Comprehensive business alliance
  Japan: Internet Affiliate to Become Biggest Shareholder in Radio Firm
 Animation Phenomenon Goes to TV Tokyo Broadband Entertainment
 LewRockwell.com Becoming Financially Successful

People from Sapporo
1960 births
Living people